Kamburupitiya is a town in the Matara District, Southern Province, Sri Lanka.
 

The town is situated in a wet, hilly zone, some of the world's best cinnamon, tea with high tannin are grown. 
Traditional employment is growing rubber and working on the rice paddy fields in the low-lying lands.

References

Populated places in Southern Province, Sri Lanka
Populated places in Matara District